Ulao Creek is a  tributary of the Milwaukee River in Ozaukee County, Wisconsin, United States. It begins in a swampy area south of Port Washington in the town of Grafton and flows south through Ulao.  It roughly parallels Interstate 43 before crossing to the west of the freeway just south of Lakefield Road.  The creek then flows to the southwest into Mequon, where it joins the Milwaukee River at Bonniwell Road.

References

External links
Ulao Creek Partnership, a group dedicated to preserving the creek
Map of the creek
Behm, Don. "Habitat help: Study aims to save critters' watershed homes"  Milwaukee Journal Sentinel, April 21, 2001

Rivers of Wisconsin
Rivers of Ozaukee County, Wisconsin